Shahmahmood Miakhel (also spelled Shah Mahmood Miakhel; *01.05.1958 in Kunar, Afghanistan) (Pashto: شاه محمود میاخېل) is an Afghan politician.

He was the appointed ambassador for Afghanistan to Qatar before the Taliban overthrew the government. During the reign of Ashraf Ghani, he was considered one of the most influential politicians.

Life 
Miakhel earned his Master of Business Administration from Preston University in Pakistan. He also studied agriculture at Kabul University and completed a fellowship program at Stanford University on democracy, development and the rule of law. He has been a member of numerous NGOs and government organizations, including UN sub-organizations.

Political career 

From 2005 to 2009, he was governance advisor/head of the governance unit of the United Nations Assistance Mission (UNAMA) for Afghanistan.

Miakhel first gained notoriety as Deputy Minister for the Ministry of Interior in 2003 to 2005. From September 2009 to February 2019, he served as Country Director at the United States Institute of Peace. He gained a high-profile and popularity especially among the population through the confidence of former Afghan President Ashraf Ghani, who appointed him as governor in Nangarhar.

Also during his time in Nangarhar, he succeeded in becoming the first governor in history to ban and sanction foreign currencies. He banned the circulation of Pakistani rupees in Nangarhar after they had been used as Afghan currency in the local market for four decades. Since December 12, 2019, it was forbidden to pay with Rupee or other to pay foreign currencies. According to Afghan statistics, at the time, Nangarhar province was safer than it had ever been.

After his voluntary resignation, he was tagged as deputy defense minister. Due to a prolonged illness of the Defense Minister Asadullah Khalid, Shahmahmood Miakhel became acting Minister of Defense. He served from March 11, 2021, to June 25, 2021, and resigned due to internal issues. Miakhel was to be sent to Qatar as ambassador to also participate in the Taliban peace talks.

Private life 
Miakhel is married with seven (4 boys and 3 girls) children and holds U.S. citizenship. Miakhel is known for engaging with citizens and critics on social media like Facebook on a daily basis and fighting corruption. He advocates for women's rights and is an opponent of the current Afghan Taliban government. He has survived several attacks.

References 

1958 births
Living people
People from Kunar Province
Ambassadors of Afghanistan
Ambassadors to Qatar